The Quarry Bridge is located near Quarry, Iowa in Marshall County, Iowa. The bridge is also called the Iowa River Bridge. It was built in 1885 and has been listed on the National Register of Historic Places since 1998.

The superstructure of the bridge was fabricated by the King Iron Bridge Company of Cleveland, Ohio. The builders completed the bridge in September 1885 at a cost of $3,295.

See also
Le Grand Bridge (1896), nearby, also NRHP-listed
Le Grand Bridge (1914)

References

Bridges completed in 1885
Transportation buildings and structures in Marshall County, Iowa
Road bridges on the National Register of Historic Places in Iowa
National Register of Historic Places in Marshall County, Iowa
Truss bridges in Iowa
Whipple truss bridges in the United States